Dapsići is a village in the municipality of Berane, Montenegro.

Demographics
According to the 2011 census, its population was 674.

References

Populated places in Berane Municipality
Serb communities in Montenegro